Alastair McDonald, or variants, may refer to:

After 1900 
 Alistair MacDonald (born 1970), British judge
 Alistair Macdonald (1925–1999), British Labour party politician
 Alastair Macdonald (surveyor) (born 1932), British land surveyor and author
 Alastair Macdonald (historian), Scottish historian
 Alastair McDonald (musician) (born 1941), Scottish banjo-playing folk/jazz musician
 Alisdair Macdonald (1940–2007), British press photographer

Pre-20th century 
 Alastair Macdonald (British Army officer), 19th century Commander-in-Chief, Scotland
 Alasdair Mac Colla (died 1647), 17th century Scottish military officer
 Alexander of Islay, Earl of Ross (died 1449), also known as Alasdair MacDonald, 15th century Scottish nobleman
 Alistair Carragh Macdonald, 15th century Scottish nobleman
 Alasdair Óg of Islay (died 1299), known as Alasdair MacDonald, 13th century Scottish Lord of Islay and chief of Clann Domhnaill
 Alasdair Mór, 13th century Scottish nobleman and eponymous ancestor of Clan MacAlister